The town and commune of Zapallar is in Chile's Petorca Province, which is part of the Valparaíso Region. 

The community covers 288 km2 (111 square miles) of land. 

A horseshoe bay protects the beach resort town of Zapallar, which was built along high slopes. 

The topography is rough, with high cliffs and rocky precipices to the north and south of the town center. 

A three-kilometer-long stone-masonry promenade runs along, the beach in the town. 

Zapallar is two hours northwest of Santiago and 70 minutes north of Viña del Mar.

Demographics
According to the 2002 census of the National Statistics Institute, Zapallar had 5,659 inhabitants (2,914 men and 2,745 women). Of these, 4,744 (83.8%) lived in urban areas and 915 (16.2%) in rural areas. The population grew by 24.3% (1,105 persons) between the 1992 and 2002 censuses.

Administration
As a commune, Zapallar is a third-level administrative division of Chile administered by a communal council, headed by an alcalde who is directly elected every four years. Between 2012 and 2016 the major was Nicolás Cox Urrejola. The communal council has the following members:
 Diego Farias Vásquez (UDI)
 Luis Guajardo Abarca (RN)
 Max Correa Achurra (EVO-IND)
 Danilo Fernández Peña (PS)
 Felipe Zamorano Palacios (IND-RN)
 Claudia Vargas Astudillo (DC)

The commune of Zapallar belongs to the Electoral District No. 6 (Cabildo, Calera, Hijuelas, La Cruz, La Ligua, Nogales, Papudo, Petorca, Puchuncaví, Quillota, Quintero, Zapallar, Calle Larga, Catemu, Llay Llay, Los Andes, Panquehue, Putaendo, Rinconada, San Esteban, San Felipe, Santa María, Limache, Olmué, Quilpué, Villa Alemana. Zapallar is represented in the Chamber of Deputies by Camila Flores (RN), Diego Ibáñez (RD), Pablo Kast (EVO), Andrés Longton (RN), Carolina Marzán (PPD), Luis Pardo (RN), Marcelo Schilling (PS) and Daniel Verdessy (DC).

Zapallar belongs to the VI Senate Circumscription (Valparaíso). The commune is represented in the Senate by Isabel Allende Bussi (PS), Francisco Chahuán Chahuán (RN), Juan Ignacio Latorre (RD), Kenneth Pugh (IND), Ricardo Lagos Weber (PPD).

See also
 List of towns in Chile

References

External links

  Municipality of Zapallar

Populated places in Petorca Province
Communes of Chile
Capitals of Chilean provinces
Coasts of Valparaíso Region